Wild Animal Ethics: The Moral and Political Problem of Wild Animal Suffering is a 2020 book by the philosopher Kyle Johannsen, that examines whether humans, from a deontological perspective, have a duty to reduce wild animal suffering. He concludes that such a duty exists and recommends effective interventions that could be potentially undertaken to help these sentient individuals.

Summary 
Johannsen starts by examining the question of what is good about nature. He puts forward a number of arguments for why wild animals generally do not live good lives, such as the dominance of reproductive strategies which mean that large numbers of offspring are born, of which the great majority experience suffering and die before reaching adulthood. He also highlights different forms of suffering that these sentient individuals experience including predation, weather conditions, starvation, stress, injury and parasitism. Johannsen then explores the value of naturalness and the popularity of a positive view of nature.

In the following two sections, Johannsen asserts that humans have a collective obligation to intervene in nature to reduce the suffering of wild animals and evaluates the risks associated with intervention. He then explores the concept of editing nature, using technologies such as CRISPR and gene drives. The final section investigates how intervention relates to animal rights advocacy.

Reception 
A symposium was held on the book in April 2021, hosted by Animals in Philosophy, Politics, Law, and Ethics (APPLE) at Queens University, featuring commentaries by Nicolas Delon, Bob Fischer, Gary O'Brien, and Clare Palmer; these were later published in the journal Philosophia. 

Nicolas Delon's commentary argues that the book largely overlooks the issues of agency and freedom. Despite this, he gives Johannsen credit for considering liberty as an issue and for favoring interventions which minimize infringements of liberty.  

Bob Fischer's commentary challenges Johannsen's claims on habitat destruction in two ways.  

O'Brien's commentary takes exception with Johanssen's assertion that the non-identity problem has no effect on the reasons to intervene in nature. O'Brien argues that large scale interventions in nature will, in turn, change the types of animals that will come into existence and, as a result, enable harms experienced by and inflicted by these individuals. In conclusion, he asserts that "by causing animals to exist, knowing that they will inflict and suffer harms, we become morally responsible for those harms."  

Palmer's commentary questions Johannsen's claim that naturalness, or wildness, is not intrinsically valuable and the assertion that the majority of wild animals have terrible lives. On the latter, Palmer asserts that more evidence is needed and for the former she contends that Johannsen mischaracterizes the significance of the value of wildness which could lead to conflicts with his suggested wide-scale interventions. She concludes that if he wants to gain democratic legitimacy for such interventions, he needs to give more serious attention to such conflicts.  

Johannsen responds to the commentaries in his paper "Defending Wild Animal Ethics". 

Jeff Sebo describes the book as "an excellent book that makes a powerful case for reducing wild animal suffering". Jeff McMahan asserts that: "The suffering of animals in the wild is a serious moral issue, to which this book is a sensible, well-argued, and humane response.

References

Further reading

External links 
 Reducing wild animal suffering with Kyle Johannsen - Knowing Animals podcast
 Kyle Johannsen, "Wild Animal Ethics: The Moral and Political Problem of Wild Animal Suffering" (Routledge, 2020) - New Books in Philosophy podcast

2020 non-fiction books
Animal ethics books
Books about wild animal suffering
Books in political philosophy
English-language books
Environmental ethics books
Routledge books